Nicolai Ouroussoff (born October 3, 1962) is a writer and educator who was an architecture critic for the Los Angeles Times and The New York Times.

Biography
Born in Cambridge, Massachusetts to a family from Russia, he received a bachelor's degree in Russian from Georgetown University and a master's degree in architecture from the Columbia Graduate School of Architecture, Planning and Preservation. He is currently Adjunct Associate Professor of Architecture at Columbia Graduate School of Architecture, Planning and Preservation.

A protégé of the late Herbert Muschamp, Ouroussoff replaced his mentor as the New York Times architecture critic in 2004 after his stint at the Los Angeles Times. He wrote the newspaper's obituary for Muschamp in 2007.

Ouroussoff was a nominated finalist for the Pulitzer Prize in criticism in 2003, 2004, 2006, and 2011. 

In 2011, it was announced that he would leave The New York Times to write a book. He was succeeded as architectural critic by Michael Kimmelman.

He is married to the U.K.-born painter Cecily Brown.

References

External links
Nicolai Ouroussoff
Designs Solicited, Discussion Unwanted at the Barnes Foundation

American male non-fiction writers
Los Angeles Times people
Critics employed by The New York Times
Georgetown University alumni
Columbia Graduate School of Architecture, Planning and Preservation alumni
Living people
American architecture critics
Place of birth missing (living people)
1962 births
20th-century American journalists
American male journalists